{{DISPLAYTITLE:C6H5N3}}
The molecular formula C6H5N3 (molar mass: 119.12 g/mol) may refer to:

 Benzotriazole (BTA)
 Phenyl azide
 Pyrazolopyrimidine